Helena Ponette (born 3 February 2000) is a Belgian sprinter specialising in the 400 metres.

Ponette competed in the 4 x 400 m event at the 2021 European U23 Championships in Tallinn, Estonia. At the same event, she was selected for the 2022 World Athletics Indoor Championships in Belgrade, Serbia.

In 2022, Ponette finished second at the 2022 Belgian Athletics Championships behind Naomi Van Den Broeck in the 400 m with a time of 51.93 s. She was the fifth Belgian to run faster than 52 s. She thus secured a place in the Belgian 4 x 400 m relay team for the World Championships later that year in Eugene, Oregon, U.S.A.

References

External links
 

2000 births
Living people
Belgian female sprinters
World Athletics Championships athletes for Belgium
20th-century Belgian women
21st-century Belgian women